Greig Smith is a former member of the Los Angeles, California, City Council.

City Council

Greig Smith was a member of the Los Angeles City Council from 2003 to 2011.  On January 15, 2019 Smith was appointed to his previous seat on the Los Angeles City Council on a temporary basis. He represented the 12th District in the Northwestern San Fernando Valley, which includes Chatsworth, Granada Hills, Northridge, and other communities. Smith resigned on August 23, 2019. John Lee, who was elected to succeed Smith, was sworn to Smith's former Council seat on August 30, 2019.

He was elected to the L.A. City Council in 2003 defeating Los Angeles School Board member Julie Kornstein in the race to succeed Hal Bernson. At that time he was one of two Republican Party members of the City Council.  His former seat was the only Republican seat on the Council before Lee's switch to Independent in 2020.

In his prior service as a Councilman, he made waste management his main issue and was successful in lobbying his colleagues to unanimously pass his comprehensive blueprint for the city, RENEW LA—Recovering Energy, Natural Resources, and Economic Benefit from Waste for Los Angeles.

Personal life
Smith is also a Reserve Los Angeles Police Department Officer. He currently serves as a Cold Case Homicide Detective with the elite Robbery-Homicide Division. Prior to serving on the Council, Smith owned a family clothing business, was the Chief of Staff to former Councilman Hal Bernson, and was a community activist. He holds two degrees from the University of Southern California and a certificate from the University of California, Los Angeles.

Prior to his 2019 appointment, Smith was president of a consulting firm specializing in governmental liaison and representation, environmental and waste management expertise. The firm is Greig Smith Consulting LLC.

References

Author "If City Halls Walls Could Talk"

External links
L.A. Times: Greig Smith — news, photos, and video archive (index)

Los Angeles City Council members
California Republicans
Politicians from Los Angeles
University of Southern California alumni
University of California, Los Angeles alumni
Year of birth missing (living people)
Living people